Laramani (Aymara larama blue, -ni a suffix to indicate ownership, "the one with blue color") is a mountain in the Andes of Peru, about  high. It is located in the Cusco Region, Canas Province, on the border of the districts Kunturkanki and Layo, and in the Espinar Province, Pichigua District. A stream named Pumanuta originates east of the mountain. It flows to the lake Langui Layo north of Laramani.

References

Mountains of Peru
Mountains of Cusco Region